Olga Ferri  (20 September 1928 – 15 September 2012) was an Argentine choreographer and ballet dancer. She joined the Ballet of the Teatro Colón at eighteen and was prima ballerina from 1949.

References

1928 births
2012 deaths
Argentine ballerinas
Argentine choreographers